Visucius was a Gallo-Roman god, usually identified with Mercury. He was worshipped primarily in the east of Gaul, around Trier and on the Rhine; his name is recorded on about ten dedicatory inscriptions. One such inscription has also been found in Bordeaux. Visucius is, along with Gebrinius and Cissonius, among the most common indigenous epithets of the Gaulish Mercury.

The name has sometimes been interpreted as meaning "of the ravens" or "knowledgeable"; cf. the Proto-Celtic roots *wesāko- 'raven, grebe' (cf. Old Irish disyllabic fiach, Welsh gwyach) and *witsu- 'knowing'.

The variant or mistaken spelling Visuclus is also attested.

In a Latin inscription from Rheinzabern, Germany (CIL 13, 5991) dedicated to Jupiter, Apollo, and Visucius, the name SOLI T[...] appears after Visucius, perhaps originally standing for Solitumarus, an epithet of Mercury's in an inscription (AE 2001, 1388; AE 2008, 901) found at Chateaubleau, France.

Another inscription is co-dedicated to Sancta Visucia, as well as to Mercurius Visucius. This goddess, apparently a companion or analogue of Visucius, has sometimes been likened to Rosmerta or Maia, who also accompany Mercury on many Gaulish dedications.

One inscription dedicated to Visugius has also been found at Agoncillo in Spain; this may perhaps refer to the same deity.

References

Gaulish gods
Mercurian deities
Mercury (mythology)